Moseleyville is an census-designated place and unincorporated community located in Daviess County, Kentucky, United States.

Demographics

History
It was named for the Moseley family.  There was a post office from 1886 to 1909.

References

Unincorporated communities in Daviess County, Kentucky
Unincorporated communities in Kentucky